Ties That Bind is a Canadian-American drama series that premiered on the UP network on August 12, 2015. The first season consisted of 10 episodes. It was cancelled after the first season. In the UK it was screened as "Detective McLean".

The series stars Kelli Williams as experienced police officer Allison McLean who balances life with her job, husband Matt (Jonathan Scarfe), and teenager children Jeff (Mitchell Kummen) and Rachel (Natasha Calis). Allison's life changes when her brother Tim (Luke Perry) is arrested and sent to prison. She takes in his teenage children—her niece and nephew Cameron (Rhys Matthew Bond) and Mariah (Matreya Scarrwener). Allison and her family must adjust to their new situation and band together.

Cast

 Kelli Williams as Allison McLean, a police detective, Matt's wife, and mother to Jeff and Rachel
 Jonathan Scarfe as Matt McLean, Allison's husband, and father to Jeff and Rachel
 Dion Johnstone as Devin Stewart, Allison's partner
 Mitchell Kummen as Jeff McLean, Allison and Matt's teenage son
 Luke Perry as Tim Olson, Allison's brother, and father to Cameron and Mariah
 Natasha Calis as Rachel McLean, Allison and Matt's teenage daughter
 Rhys Matthew Bond as Cameron Olson, Tim's teenage son, and Allison's nephew
 Matreya Scarrwener as Mariah Olson, Tim's teenage daughter, and Allison's niece

Episodes

References

External links
 
 

2015 American television series debuts
2015 American television series endings
2010s American drama television series
2015 Canadian television series debuts
2015 Canadian television series endings
2010s Canadian drama television series